Quark/2 is a 1971 anthology of short stories and poetry edited by Samuel R. Delany and Marilyn Hacker. It is the second volume in the Quark series.  The stories and poems are original to this anthology.

Contents
 Introduction, by Samuel R. Delany & Marilyn Hacker
 "The Interstate", by John Sladek
 "A Possible Episode in the Picaresque Adventures of Mr. J.H.B. Monstrosee", by Carol Emshwiller
 "Trojak", by Marek Obtulowicz
 "Gold, Black, and Silver", by Fritz Leiber
 "Mensuration", by James Sallis
 Six Drawings, by Roger Penney
 "The Voice of the Sonar in My Vermiform Appendix", by Philip José Farmer
 "The Way Home", by Joan Bernott
 "Among the Dead", by Edward Bryant
 "The Last Supper", by Russell FitzGerald
 "The Village", by Leland Stoney
 "Arpad", by Alexei Panshin
 "Bitching It", by Sonya Dorman
 Five Drawings, by Nemi Frost
 "Et in Arcadia Ego", by Thomas M. Disch
 "Landscape for Insurrection", by Marilyn Hacker
 "The People of Prashad", by James Keilty
 "The Inception of the Epoch of Mrs. Bedonebyasyoudid", by John Brunner
 "The Electric Neon Mermaid", by Laurence Yep
 Photografic cover by Ira Wood

References

1971 anthologies
Science fiction anthology series